A blackback is a sexually mature male gorilla of up to 11 years of age.

Blackback may also refer to:

 Alosa kessleri, a herring of the family Clupeidae
 Great blackback, a very large gull which breeds on the European and North American coasts and islands of the North Atlantic
 Lesser blackback, a large gull which breeds on the Atlantic coasts of Europe
 Kelp gull, a large gull that breeds throughout the Southern Hemisphere

See also
 Black back, a flatfish of the family Pleuronectidae

Animal common name disambiguation pages